Christopher Logue, CBE (23 November 1926 – 2 December 2011) was an English poet associated with the British Poetry Revival, and a pacifist.

Life 
Born in Portsmouth, Hampshire, and brought up in the Portsmouth area, Logue was the only child of middle-aged parents, John and Molly Logue, who married late. He attended Roman Catholic schools, including St John's College, Portsmouth, Prior Park College, before going to Portsmouth Grammar School. On call-up, he enlisted in the Black Watch, and was posted to Palestine. He was court-martialled in 1945 over a scheme to sell stolen pay books, and sentenced to 16 months' imprisonment, served partly in Acre Prison. He lived in Paris from 1951 to 1956, and was a friend of Alexander Trocchi.
  
In 1958 he joined the first of the Aldermaston Marches, organised by the Direct Action Committee Against Nuclear War. He was on the Committee of 100. 
He served a month in jail for refusing to be bound over not to continue with the 17 September 1961 Parliament Square sit-down. He heard Bertrand Russell tell the Bow Street magistrate, "I came here to save your life. But, having heard what you have to say, I don't think the end justifies the means." In Drake Hall open prison he and fellow protesters were set to work – "Some wit allocated it" – demolishing a munitions factory.

He was friends for many years with author and translator Austryn Wainhouse, with whom he carried on a lively correspondence for decades.

Career 
Logue was a playwright and screenwriter as well as a film actor. His screenplays were Savage Messiah and The End of Arthur's Marriage. He was a contributor to Private Eye magazine between 1962 and 1993, as well as writing for Alexander Trocchi's literary journal, Merlin. 
Logue won the 2005 Whitbread Poetry Award for Cold Calls.

His early popularity was marked by the release of a loose adaptation of Pablo Neruda's Twenty Love Poems, later broadcast on BBC Radio's Third Programme on 8 March 1959 with the poems, read by Logue himself, set to jazz by pianist Bill Le Sage and drummer Tony Kinsey and a band featuring Kenny Napper on bass, Ken Wray on trombone and Les Condon on trumpet.  A version of the performance  was later released as a 7-inch EP (extended play) record, "Red Bird: Jazz and Poetry".

One of his poems, Be Not Too Hard, was set to music by Donovan and heard in the film Poor Cow (1967), and was made popular by Joan Baez on her eponymous 1967 album, Joan. Another completely different song titled "Be Not Too Hard" based on the poem was performed by Manfred Mann's Earth Band on their 1974 album The Good Earth. The arrangement was written by Mick Rogers, who had Logue credited as a co-writer on the record sleeve. Another well-known and well-quoted poem by Logue was Come to the Edge, which is often attributed to Guillaume Apollinaire, but is in fact only dedicated to him. It was originally written for a poster advertising an Apollinaire exhibition at the ICA in 1961 or 1962, and was titled "Apollinaire Said", hence the misattribution. 
His last major work was an long-term project to render Homer's Iliad into a modernist idiom. 
This work is published in a number of small books, usually equating to two or three books of the original text. (The volume, Homer: War Music, was shortlisted for the 2002 International Griffin Poetry Prize.)
He published an autobiography, Prince Charming (1999).

His lines tended to be short, pithy and frequently political, as in Song of Autobiography:

He wrote the couplet that is sung at the beginning and end of the film A High Wind in Jamaica (1965), the screenplay for Savage Messiah (1972), a television version of Antigone (1962), and a short play for the TV series The Wednesday Play titled The End of Arthur's Marriage (1965), which was directed by Ken Loach.  The latter film was generally light-hearted, but dealt with the pre-occupation in modern British society with ownership of property and with the treatment of animals by humans.

He appeared in a number of films as an actor, most notably in the Ken Russell films The Devils (1971, as Cardinal Richelieu) and Prisoner of Honor (1991, as Fernand Labori), and as the spaghetti-eating fanatic in Terry Gilliam's Jabberwocky (1977).
Logue wrote for the Olympia Press under the pseudonym Count Palmiro Vicarion, including a pornographic novel, Lust.

Family 
Logue married biographer Rosemary Hill in 1985. He died on 2 December 2011, aged 85.

Works 

Poetry
 Wand And Quadrant, Collection Merlin, Paris, 1953
 The Weekdream Sonnets, Jack Straw Press, Paris, 1955
 Devil, Maggot and Son,  Peter Russell, 1956
 The Man Who Told His Love, Scorpion Press, 1958
 A Song For Kathleen, Villiers, 1958
 Songs, Hutchinsin & Co., 1959
 Songs from the Lily-White Boys, Scorpion Press, 1960
 7 Songs from the Establishment, Sydney Bron Music Co. Ltd., London, 1962
 Count Palmiro Vicarion's Book of Limericks, Olympia Press, Paris, 1962
 Count Palmiro Vicarion's Book of Bawdy Ballads, Olympia Press, Paris, 1962
 The Arrival of the Poet in the City, The Yellow Press / Mandarin Books, 1963
 Patrocleia, University of Michigan Press, 1963
 The Words of the Establishment Songs etcetera, Poet & Printer, London, 1966
 Selections from a Correspondence Between an Irishman and a Rat, Goliard Press, London, 1966
 PAX - Book XIX of The Iliad, Rapp & Carroll Ltd, London, 1967
 Hermes Flew to Olympus, (self-published), 1968
 The Girls, Bernard Stone, 1969
 New Numbers, Cape, 1969
 How to Find Poetry Everywhere, (self-published), 1970
 For Talitha. 1941-1971., Steam Press, 1971
 The Isles of Jessamy, November Books, 1971
 Twelve Cards, Lorrimer Publishing Ltd., 1971
 Duet for Mole and Worm, Cafe Books, 1972
 What, The Keepsake Press, 1972
 Singles, John Roberts Press, 1973
 Mixed Rushes, John Roberts Press, 1974
 Urbanal, (self-published) 1975
 Red Bird- Love Poems based on the Spanish of Pablo Neruda, Circle Press, 1979
 Ode to the dodo: poems from 1953 to 1978, Cape, 1981, 
 Fluff, Bernard Stone, 1984
 Lucky Dust, Anvil, 1985
 The Seven Deadly Sins- Translations of Bertolt Brecht, Ambit Books, 1986
 ; University of Chicago Press, 2003,  
 Kings: An Account of Books 1 and 2 of Homer's Iliad Farrar, Straus, Giroux, 1991, 
 The Husbands: An Account of Books 3 and 4 of Homer's Iliad Farrar, Straus, and Giroux, 1995, 
 Selected poems, Faber and Faber, 1996, 
 
 Cold calls: war music continued, Volume 1, Faber and Faber, 2005, 

Prose
 Prince Charming: a memoir, Faber and Faber, 1999, ; Faber, 2001, 
 ; (under pseudonym of Count Palmiro Vicarion), Olympia Press, 2005,

In popular culture 
In Monday Begins on Saturday, a 1964 science fiction/fantasy novel by Arkady and Boris Strugatsky, Magnus Red'kin, a character in the novel, quotes a fragment of a Logue poem:

as one of the definitions of happiness from his extensive collection, and complains that "such things do not allow for algorithmisation".

In the 1967 TV programme Donovan Meets Logue, the following Logue poems were featured:

 The Plane Crash
 Be Not Too Hard

and

Notes

References

External links 

 Christopher Logue Papers at the Harry Ransom Center
 Christopher Logue Collection at Emory University
 
 Christopher Logue at the Academy of American Poets
 
 Essay on Logue's Homer
 Bibliography from the USC College of Liberal Arts
 Profile in The Independent (UK)
 Griffin Poetry Prize biography, including audio clip
 A blog page on the Red Bird recordings.

1926 births
2011 deaths
20th-century English male writers
20th-century English poets
21st-century English male writers
British Army personnel of World War II
British Poetry Revival
Commanders of the Order of the British Empire
Costa Book Award winners
English male film actors
English male poets
English male screenwriters
English pacifists
English screenwriters
People educated at The Portsmouth Grammar School
People educated at Prior Park College
Writers from Portsmouth
Place of death missing
Private Eye contributors
Translators of Homer
Black Watch soldiers
British Army personnel who were court-martialled